The Silver Creek Bridge, near Winfield, Kansas, is a double arch bridge that crosses the Walnut River built in c.1908-09.  Also known as the Jordan Bridge, it was listed on the National Register of Historic Places in 1987.

It is earth loaded.

References

External links

Bridges on the National Register of Historic Places in Kansas
Bridges completed in 1908
Cowley County, Kansas
Bridges in Kansas